The Mission-Aransas National Estuarine Research Reserve, currently directed by Jace Tunnell, is a large contiguous complex of wetland, terrestrial, and marine environments on the Texas Coastal Bend in the United States. Named for the two major rivers that flow into the area, the reserve contains public and private lands and waters. The land is primarily coastal prairie with unique oak motte habitats. The wetlands include riparian habitat, freshwater marshes, and saltwater marshes. Within the water areas, the bays are large, open, and include extensive tidal flats, seagrass meadows, mangroves, and oyster reefs. These unique and diverse estuarine habitats in the western Gulf of Mexico support a host of endangered and threatened species including the endangered whooping crane.

Traditional activities within the reserve include boating, fishing, hunting, oil and gas extraction, shellfish harvesting, camping and recreational activities. Despite a long history of human uses and its close proximity to the city of Corpus Christi, the reserve is relatively rural and pristine.

Visitor facilities

The University of Texas Marine Science Institute operates locations for visitors to learn about and explore the reserve.

 University of Texas Marine Science Institute Visitor Center - located in Port Aransas, features seven aquaria representing typical Texas coastal habitats, self guided tours and educational movies.  The facility also includes a gift shop.
 Wetlands Education Center- located in Port Aransas, an artificial wetlands seagrass pond that occupies 3.5 acres between the MSI Visitors Center and the South Jetty. Visitors can tour a boardwalk around the pond to view the vegetation and the wildlife, and view educational signage.
 Bay Education Center - located in Rockport, Texas, features exhibits about the estuary's ecosystem and Science On a Sphere, a spherical display system created by NOAA to illustrate Earth science concepts.
Amos Rehabilitation Keep (ARK) - located in Port Aransas, Texas - The primary mission of the Amos Rehabilitation Keep (or ARK) is to rescue and rehabilitate sick and injured birds, sea turtles, terrestrial turtles, and tortoises found along the South Texas coast and to return them to their native habitat.  For coastal wildlife emergencies, please contact the Amos Rehabilitation Keep at 361-749-6793.  The ARK also has a Facebook page, Animal Rehabilitation Keep (ARK) at UT Marine Science Institute.   The ARK performs turtle releases throughout the year when turtles are ready to be released.  These events are open to the public, free of charge, and very popular within the community.  The ARK was founded by Tony Amos and is one of the original and largest wildlife rehabilitation facilities in the area, relying on a small staff and a large team of volunteers.
Volunteering - the Reserve relies on a large number of volunteers.  Visit the website for more information.

References

External links
 Official website
 University of Texas Marine Science Institute - Visitor information

Protected areas of Texas
National Estuarine Research Reserves of the United States
Protected areas of Aransas County, Texas
Protected areas of Refugio County, Texas
Wetlands of Texas
Estuaries of Texas
Landforms of Aransas County, Texas
Landforms of Refugio County, Texas
Nature centers in Texas